Look Hear? is the seventh studio album by 10cc, released in 1980.

Overview
The album was recorded after a long break the band had to take due to Eric Stewart's car accident in January 1979 that left him with blindness in one eye and temporary hearing loss in one ear.
Like previous albums, it was recorded at the band's Strawberry Studios South in Dorking, Surrey.

At the time of the recording Graham Gouldman was coming through a divorce and it was reflected in the songs that he wrote for the album, "How'm I Ever Gonna Say Goodbye" and "I Hate to Eat Alone". These two songs also had little to none contribution from Eric Stewart in the studio: only percussion on "I Hate to Eat Alone" and nothing at all on "How'm I Ever Gonna Say Goodbye". Like the previous 10cc album, Bloody Tourists, Look Hear? featured songwriting contributions from other members of the band and the album was the first by 10cc since the departure of Godley and Creme to include songs written by neither Graham Gouldman or Eric Stewart.

Around the time of sessions for Look Hear? Eric Stewart started recording a soundtrack for the film Girls and one of the songs recorded and intended for Look Hear?, "Make the Pieces Fit", was eventually released on Stewart's solo album.

The cover art, created by Hipgnosis, led to speculation that the album was titled Are You Normal and underwent significant alteration for the album's U.S. release: the prominent display of the words "Are you normal" was replaced by a photo of a sheep relaxing on a beach, an image that was used as an insert on the original release of the album.

Release and reception
The album was the band's first for their new label in the U.S., Warner Bros. Records. In the review of May 3, 1980 Billboard's observer gladly noticed that "the departure of Lol Creme and Kevin Godley from the band some time ago has not proven disastrous as this effort shows its creative juices are still flowing" and this album is full of "wit, charm and a pop sensibility." 

Two singles were lifted from the album: "One-Two-Five (edit)"/"Only Child" and "It Doesn't Matter at All"/"From Rochdale to Ocho Rios". While the singles failed to chart in the U.K., "One-Two-Five" fared better in Europe and peaking at #9 in Norway. In the U.S. only "It Doesn't Matter at All" was released (B-side changed to "Strange Lover") and it failed to chart.

Look Hear? reached #35 in the UK and #180 in the United States, disappointing positions compared to the previous 10cc albums. However, the album performed better elsewhere reaching #3 in Norway and top 20 and 30 in Sweden and Netherlands respectively.

Both Gouldman and Stewart would later express their disappointment with the album's lukewarm reception, but they would also acknowledge that their hearts might not have been in it. At the time of its making, Stewart was still recovering from an automobile accident. They also admit that the hiatus the band was forced to go into following Stewart's accident was the beginning of the end, and that musical tastes had shifted in the interim.

The album was reissued in 2008 on CD with bonus tracks from "One-Two-Five" single.

Track listing

Personnel 

 Eric Stewart – lead vocals, guitars, electric piano, vocoder, slide lead guitar, marracas, percussion
 Graham Gouldman – lead vocals, bass, guitars, congas
 Rick Fenn – vocals, guitars, lead vocals (4), co-lead vocals (3)
 Duncan Mackay – Yamaha CS80 synthesizer, organ, Hohner Clavinet duo, harpsichord, vocoder, tubular bells, electric piano, grand piano
 Paul Burgess – drums, percussion, marimba, timpani
 Stuart Tosh – backing vocals, percussion, timpani

Charts

References 

10cc albums
1980 albums
Albums with cover art by Hipgnosis
Mercury Records albums
Warner Records albums
Albums recorded at Strawberry Studios